Robert Kobena Dentu is a Ghanaian Church of Pentecost minister, and a former director of the Ghana Evangelism Committee (2011- 2015). He participated in creating the Ghana Evangelism Committee through which the National Congress on Evangelism (NACO) emerged in 2012.  

The National Congress on Evangelism (NACO 2012) was a product of a collaborative partnership with other churches in Ghana.

Dentu holds the position of Area Head for the Church of Pentecost in Nkawkaw, where he remains active as an evangelist.

References

Ghanaian religious leaders
Ghanaian Pentecostals
People from Western Region (Ghana)
Living people
Year of birth missing (living people)